This is a list of films which have placed number one at the weekend box office in Romania during 2019.

Highest-grossing films

Avengers: Endgame, Joker, Frozen II & Jumanji: The Next Level became the 9th, 10th, 11th & 12th films respectively to surpass the 10 million lei mark, the latter being the first animated film to surpass that mark. The Lion King became the highest-grossing animated film in Romania at the time, before it was surpassed by Frozen II later in the year. 5Gang: A Different Kind of Christmas became the highest grossing romanian film at the time.

Notes 

 In its 11th weekend, Moromete Family: On the Edge of Time became the highest-grossing Romanian film at the time. In its 3rd weekend, Oh, Ramona! became the highest-grossing Romanian film at the time.

References 

Romania
2019
2019 in Romania